Balt is a medical equipment manufacturer specializing in medical devices designed to treat stroke and other neurovascular diseases.

Presentation 
Balt was founded as a small family business in 1977 by Leopold Płowiecki, in France. His son, Nicolas, grew the company until 2018. Bridgepoint Advisers took a stake in 2015. Balt began to expand internationally. Pascal Girin CEO of Balt International since 2016, was appointed as Balt’s CEO in late 2018.

Balt initially focused on plastic micro-tubes for the pharmaceutical industry. In 1987, it developed a microcatheter enabling the treatment of arteriovenous malformations. The Silk Vista Baby, one of the company’s most recent innovations released in 2018, is the world’s smallest collapsible intracranial stent.

Balt's revenues tripled between 2015 and 2020 and its workforce, quadrupled to reach 500 employees worldwide in 2020. Balt sells its production to 100 countries around the world. Between 2016 and 2019, the company acquired the American start-up Blockade Medical, which also produces medical devices, as well as several of its distributors in Europe, China, India and Brazil. Today, Balt operates in ten different geographical locations worldwide.

References

External links
 

1977 establishments in France
Companies based in Île-de-France
Life sciences industry
Medical and health organizations based in France